Mario Francisco Guillén Guillén (born 4 October 1970) is a Mexican politician affiliated with the PVEM. He currently serves, since 16 July 2013, as Deputy of the LXII Legislature of the Mexican Congress representing Chiapas.

References

1970 births
Living people
People from Chiapas
Ecologist Green Party of Mexico politicians
21st-century Mexican politicians
Deputies of the LXII Legislature of Mexico
Members of the Chamber of Deputies (Mexico) for Chiapas